Stefan Herzog (born March 19, 1983, in Salzburg) is an Austrian ice hockey forward currently playing for the Graz 99ers of the Erste Bank Hockey League.

Career 
Herzog began his career with EK Zell am See for three seasons. He then moved to VSV EC in 2002 where he spent four seasons. His best performance was in the 2003/04 season when he scored 16 goals and 22 points in 48 games. In the following two seasons he had just 5 goals and 9 points. He joined Graz in 2006.

External links

1983 births
Austrian ice hockey forwards
Graz 99ers players
Living people
Sportspeople from Salzburg
EC VSV players